Seán Flanagan (26 January 1922 – 5 February 1993) was an Irish Fianna Fáil politician and Gaelic footballer. He served as Minister for Health from 1966 to 1969, Minister for Lands from 1969 to 1973 and Parliamentary Secretary to the Minister for Industry and Commerce from 1965 to 1966. He served as a Member of the European Parliament (MEP) for the Connacht–Ulster constituency from 1979 to 1989. He served as a Teachta Dála (TD) for the Mayo South constituency from 1951 to 1969 and for the Mayo East constituency from 1969 to 1977.

Early life
Flanagan was born in Coolnaha, Aghamore, Ballyhaunis, County Mayo in 1922. He was educated locally, then later at St Jarlath's College in Tuam, County Galway, where he showed enthusiasm for sport. He won two Connacht championship medals with the college in 1939 and in 1940. He breifly studied at the seminary at Clonliffe College in Dublin, and then enrolled in University College Dublin, where he studied law and qualified as a solicitor.

Football career
Flanagan also played senior Gaelic football for Mayo. He captained the All-Ireland final-winning sides of 1950 and 1951, and won five Connacht senior championship medals in all. He also won two National Football League titles in 1949 and 1954. While still a footballer, Flanagan entered into a career in politics.

In recognition of his skills and long-running contribution to the sport, Flanagan was awarded the 1992 All-Time All Star Award as no GAA All Stars Awards were being issued at the time of his playing career. In 1984, the Gaelic Athletic Association centenary year he was honoured by being named on their Football Team of the Century. In 1999, he was again honoured by the GAA by being named on their Gaelic Football Team of the Millennium.

Political career
Flanagan came from a Fianna Fáil family, and was recruited into the party in east Mayo. He was elected a Fianna Fáil TD for Mayo South at the 1951 general election, and won a seat—first there, then from 1969 in Mayo East—at each subsequent election until he lost his seat at the 1977 general election.

Flanagan rose rapidly through the party ranks, and was appointed a Parliamentary Secretary under Taoiseach Seán Lemass in 1959. In the Fianna Fáil leadership election in 1966 Flanagan supported Jack Lynch. When Lynch became Taoiseach, Flanagan was promoted to the Cabinet as Minister for Health. Three years later in 1969, he became Minister for Lands. Flanagan lost his seat at the 1977 general election, and effectively retired from domestic politics; however, he was elected to the European Parliament in the first direct elections in 1979. He was re-elected in 1984, and retired from politics in 1989.

Flanagan died on 5 February 1993, at the age of 71.

See also
List of people on the postage stamps of Ireland

References

External links

1922 births
1993 deaths
All-Ireland-winning captains (football)
Alumni of University College Dublin
Fianna Fáil TDs
Fianna Fáil MEPs
Irish solicitors
Irish sportsperson-politicians
Mayo inter-county Gaelic footballers
Members of the 14th Dáil
Members of the 15th Dáil
Members of the 16th Dáil
Members of the 17th Dáil
Members of the 18th Dáil
Members of the 19th Dáil
Members of the 20th Dáil
MEPs for the Republic of Ireland 1979–1984
MEPs for the Republic of Ireland 1984–1989
Ministers for Health (Ireland)
Parliamentary Secretaries of the 18th Dáil
People educated at St Jarlath's College
Politicians from County Mayo